Katharina Schiechtl (born 27 February 1993) is an Austrian footballer who plays as a defender for Werder Bremen.

Career statistics
Scores and results list Austria's goal tally first, score column indicates score after each Schiechtl goal.

References

External links 
 Profile at ÖFB
 
 

1993 births
Living people
People from Zams
Footballers from Tyrol (state)
Austrian women's footballers
Women's association football defenders
Austria women's international footballers
UEFA Women's Euro 2022 players
Frauen-Bundesliga players
2. Frauen-Bundesliga players
SV Werder Bremen (women) players
Austrian expatriate women's footballers
Austrian expatriate sportspeople in Germany
Expatriate women's footballers in Germany
UEFA Women's Euro 2017 players